King's Chapel is a church in Boston, Massachusetts.

King's Chapel may also refer:

 King's College Chapel, Cambridge, chapel to King's College of the University of Cambridge
 King's Chapel, Gibraltar
 King's College London Chapel, the main College Chapel at King's College London
 King's Chapel (Connecticut), Norwich, Connecticut